Iko or IKO may refer to:

 Iko (band), an English rock band
 Iko language, of Nigeria
 IK Oskarshamn, an ice hockey club from Oskarshamn, Sweden
 Nikolski Air Station (IATA code), Alaska, US
 International Karate Organization Kyokushin-kaikan - shortened IKO - one of sports organizations for Kyokushin Karate

People
 Iko Carreira (1933–2000), the first Defense Minister of Angola from 1975 to 1980
 Iko Maran (1915–1999), Estonian playwright and children's book author
 Iko Mirković, Montenegrin politician and historian
 Iko Uwais (born 1983), Indonesian actor

See also
 "Iko Iko", a 1953 song by James "Sugar Boy" Crawford
 Ico (disambiguation)